Erhart is a surname and a given name. Notable people so named include:

 Gregor Erhart (c. 1470?–1540), German sculptor
 Maria Erhart (1944–2011), Austrian international bridge player
 Michel Erhart (c. 1440-45 — after 1522), German late Gothic sculptor
 Erhard Altdorfer (c. 1480–1561), sometimes spelled Erhart, German Early Renaissance printmaker, painter and architect
 Erhart Aten (1932–2004), Micronesian politician
 Erhart or Erhard Hegenwald, 16th century writer of the Reformation
 Erhart Regier (1916-1976), Canadian politician

See also
 Erhard
 Erhardt
 Erhart, Ohio

Surnames from given names